Eugenia Gilbert (November 18, 1902 – December 9, 1978) was an American film actress of the silent era. She appeared as a leading lady in a number of westerns. In at least three films, she was billed as Eugenie Gilbert.

Biography
Gilbert was the daughter of W.B. and Eugenia Gilbert. She attended schools in South Orange, New Jersey, and New York City and the Marlborough School in Los Angeles. She won 14 beauty contests, one of which was a national contest sponsored by Rudolph Valentino, which led him to consider her "the most beautiful girl in America."

In 1924, Gilbert had her first role as leading lady in a film, after having smaller parts in westerns and comedies. In 1925, she signed a contract with Mack Sennett to act exclusively in his comedy films "for the next several years."

Filmography

 A Certain Rich Man (1921)
 The Man of the Forest (1921)
 The Man from Downing Street (1922)
 The Half Breed (1922)
 Wildcat Jordan (1922)
 Souls in Bondage (1923)
 Sinners in Silk (1924)
 Great Diamond Mystery (1924)
 The Back Trail (1924)
 So This Is Marriage (1924)
 Flames of Desire (1924)
 A Broadway Butterfly (1925)
 The Scarlet Honeymoon (1925)
 The Dressmaker from Paris (1925)
 Seven Chances (1925)
 The Man from the West (1926)
 Obey The Law (1926)
 Hair-Trigger Baxter (1926)
 Wild to Go (1926)
 The Valley of Bravery (1926)
 Laddie (1926)
 Transcontinental Limited (1926)
 Beyond the Rockies (1926)
 The Test of Donald Norton (1926)
 The Crimson Flash (1927)
 Border Blackbirds (1927)
 The Long Loop on the Pecos (1927)
 The Man from Hard Pan (1927)
 Don Desperado (1927)
 By Whose Hand? (1927)
 Melting Millions (1927)
 The Swell-Head (1927)
 The Danger Rider (1928)
 The Apache Raider (1928)
 The Boss of Rustler's Roost (1928)
 The Phantom City (1928)
 The Mysterious Airman (1928)
 The Bronc Stomper (1928)
 After the Storm (1928)
 Courtin' Wildcats (1929)

References

Bibliography 
 
 Buck Rainey. Sweethearts of the Sage: Biographies and Filmographies of 258 Actresses Appearing in Western Movies. McFarland & Company, 1992.

External links 

 

1902 births
1978 deaths
American film actresses
People from East Orange, New Jersey
20th-century American actresses